Todd McDermott (b April 6, 1966) is a multi-Emmy Award winning television journalist who has worked in several top television markets .
McDermott is a Buffalo, New York native, and has a Bachelor of Arts degree in Political Science from Canisius College in Buffalo.

From 2000 to 2004, he anchored the 5pm and weekend evening newscasts for the CBS flagship station in New York City, WCBS-TV. His tenure included anchoring coverage of the September 11th, 2001 attacks in Lower Manhattan. His reporting and anchoring from Ground Zero on the one year anniversary of the 9/11 attacks helped win him an Associated Press Award for outstanding reporting. While working for CBS in New York, he also reported for and served as an occasional host and anchor for the CBS Early Show and the CBS Morning News.

From September 2004 until September 2008, McDermott co-anchored the 6 p.m. and 11 p.m. newscast on WUSA (TV) in Washington, DC.  McDermott was paired with Tracey Neale for the first three years until January 4, 2008, and then was paired with Lesli Foster.  During his time at WUSA, he anchored live from the Pentagon on the 5th anniversary of 9/11, live from the White House for the Presidential inauguration, as well as from the U.S.  Capitol's Statuary Hall for multiple State of the Union Addresses. Todd won an Emmy for Best Anchor in the Washington DC/Baltimore region,  after multiple nominations as an anchor in D.C. and at WMAR-TV in Baltimore in the late 1990s, including a nomination for his live coverage from Washington D.C. of the impeachment of President Bill Clinton.

After leaving WUSA, Todd joined WPXI-TV, the NBC affiliate in Pittsburgh, as co-anchor of the weekday morning and noon newscasts. In October 2012, he moved to co-anchor the weeknight newscasts at WPBF, the ABC affiliate in West Palm Beach, Florida. Todd's first day at WPBF was October 22, the same day that Lynn University in Boca Raton hosted the third and final presidential debate between Barack Obama and Mitt Romney. 

In January 2015, McDermott led a team from WPBF-TV to Havana, Cuba to report live on historic diplomatic talks between the Obama administration and the Castro regime. During that time, McDermott and his coworkers gained unprecedented (at the time) access to the Cuban people in their homes. The resulting hour-long documentary, "Cuba Unlocked" was reported, written, and produced by McDermott. "Cuba Unlocked" won an Emmy in the Miami/Orlando/West Palm region for Outstanding News Special.

In October 18, 2022, McDermott moderated the Florida Senate Debate for the 2022 United States Senate election in Florida.

References

Living people
American television news anchors
Canisius College alumni
1961 births